My Own Worst Enemy is an American drama television series that aired on NBC from October 13, 2008 and ended on December 15, after 9 episodes, with its cancellation announcement after the fourth episode.

Overview

The series was produced by Universal Media Studios. Jason Smilovic was the executive producer; David Semel was the director and executive producer. The final episode ended with a cliff-hanger, and the major plot lines ended without resolution.

The series followed the life of American secret agent Edward Albright and his cover, Henry Spivey, who had no knowledge of his double life. Albright, played by Christian Slater, was implanted with a chip allowing his handlers to physically switch Albright's personality to that of his cover. However, in the pilot episode, there was a malfunction which caused Albright's personalities to switch at random, revealing his secret life to his alias.
Henry was then thrown into the highly dangerous life of Edward, with no real way for the two to communicate except through short cell phone video messages.

General Motors was a promotional sponsor of the show, and the then-new SUV model Chevrolet Traverse, along with the 2010 Chevrolet Camaro, appeared as cars for the program's characters via a product placement agreement.

Characters
Henry Spivey/Edward Albright (Both played by Christian Slater) – Henry is a middle-class efficiency expert living a humdrum life in the suburbs with a wife, two kids, and a dog. Edward is an operative who speaks 13 languages, runs a four-minute mile, and is trained to kill. Henry and Edward are polar opposites who share only one thing in common—the same body. When the carefully constructed wall between them breaks down, Henry and Edward are thrust into unfamiliar territory where each man is dangerously out of his element. The first names match those of the two dueling spirits that shared a body in Robert Louis Stevenson's novella Strange Case of Dr Jekyll and Mr Hyde.
Angie Spivey (played by Mädchen Amick) – A housewife who lives with her loving husband Henry Spivey and two children, Jack Spivey and Ruthy Spivey.
Ruthy Spivey (played by Bella Thorne) – Daughter and younger child of Henry and Angie Spivey.
Jack Spivey (played by Taylor Lautner) – Son and older child of Henry and Angie Spivey.
Mavis Heller (played by Alfre Woodard) – Edward's supervisor in the superspy organization.
Tom Grady/Raymond Carter (played by Mike O'Malley) – Raymond Carter is a superspy partner with Edward Albright. Tom Grady is Henry Spivey's friend.
Dr. Norah Skinner (played by Saffron Burrows) – Dr. Skinner is the company therapist who helps the employees. At the end of the third episode, it is discovered that she knows about Henry/Edward's secret and is currently carrying on an affair with Edward.
Alistair Trumbull (played by James Cromwell) – Trumbull is the chief of operations for Project Janus. He is both cunning and devious, and he places very little faith in Edward's capabilities as he suspects he has broken.

Reception
The first online review of the series said the show was a "snappily written, fast-paced thriller that shows Slater can be a likable TV star."  Another critic described the show as follows: "The real fun comes from watching Slater’s sly performance. Blending elements of Memento‘s "who the hell am I?" amnesia theme with the middle-class spy humor of Mr. & Mrs. Smith, the actor presents a relatively subtle take on sexy killer Edward Albright, the agent who speaks 13 languages, drives a fast car and lives in a spartan loft stuffed with high-tech weaponry." Metacritic gave the show a score of 61/100 based on 25 critic reviews.

Episodes

DVD releases
The complete series was released to DVD on April 21, 2009.

References

External links
Official NBC website

2000s American drama television series
2008 American television series debuts
2008 American television series endings
Dissociative identity disorder in television
American spy thriller television series
English-language television shows
Espionage television series
NBC original programming
Television series about families
Television series by Universal Television